Maximum Security is an American drama television series on HBO about life in a supermax prison. The 45 minute pilot premiered July 3, 1984, and the six-part series began on March 5, 1985. Its stars included Robert Desiderio, Geoffrey Lewis, and Jean Smart. Among its directors were Sharron Miller and Gilbert Moses. The series was filmed at the Lincoln Heights jail in Los Angeles, California, USA.

Cast
Robert Desiderio as prisoner Harry Kanschneider
Geoffrey Lewis as prisoner Frank Murphy
Trinidad Silva as prisoner Puck
Jean Smart as psychologist, then deputy warden, Dr. Allison Brody
Robert Alan Browne as the associate warden, Leonard Thigpen
Stephen Elliott as the warden, McShane
Stan Shaw as prisoner Papa Jack
Art Evans as prisoner Papa Jack (pilot episode only)
Panchito Gómez as prisoner Benny
Tony Plana as prisoner Benny (pilot episode only)
Gene Ross as prison guard Clarence
J.W. Smith as prison guard
Tyler Tyhurst as prisoner Snake

Episodes

References

External links

1980s American drama television series
1984 American television series debuts
1985 American television series endings
HBO original programming
English-language television shows